was a village located in Minamiazumi District, Nagano Prefecture, Japan.

As of 2003, the village had an estimated population of 17,120 and a density of 425.76 persons per km². The total area was 40.21 km².

On October 1, 2005, Misato, was merged with the town of Akashina (from Higashichikuma District), the towns of Hotaka and Toyoshina, and the village of Horigane (all from Minamiazumi District), was merged to create the city of Azumino.

External links
 Azumino official website 

Dissolved municipalities of Nagano Prefecture
Azumino, Nagano